Wallace is a Scottish & English given name meaning 'Wales' or 'of Wales, and may refer to:

Wallace (footballer, born 1989), Brazilian footballer, most recently played for Rapid Bucharest
Wallace (footballer, born May 1994), Brazilian footballer
Wallace (footballer, born October 1994), Brazilian footballer, plays for Lazio
Wallace (footballer, born 1986), Brazilian footballer
Wallace W. Andrew (1850–1919), American politician
Wallace Barnes (1926–2020), American politician
Wallace Beery (1885–1949), American actor
Wallace "Wally" Berman (1926–1976), American filmmaker and artist
Wallace Carothers (1896–1937), inventor of nylon
Wallace Chung (born 1974), Hong Kong singer and actor
Wallace E. Conkling (1896–1979), American Episcopal bishop
Wallace de Souza (born 1987), Brazilian volleyball player generally known simply as "Wallace"
Wallace H. Graham (1910–1996), White House Physician 1945–1953
Wallace Wilson Graham (1815–1898), American lawyer and legislator from Wisconsin
Wallace Gustafson (1925–2018), American lawyer and politician
Wallace Johnson (baseball) (born 1956), American former professional baseball player and coach
Wallace E. Johnson (1901–1988), co-founder of Holiday Inn
Wallace F. Johnson (1889–1971), American tennis player
Wallace J.S. Johnson (1913–1979), Mayor of Berkeley, California during the 1960s
Wallace Reid (1891–1923), American actor during the silent-film era
Wallace M. Rogerson, American exercise leader
Wallace Arthur Sabin (1869–1937), composer and organist
Wallace Clement Sabine (1868–1919), founder of acoustic science
Wallace Shawn (born 1943), American actor, comedian and playwright
Wallace Stegner (1909–1993), American environmentalist and fiction writer 
Wallace Stevens (1879–1955), American poet
Wallace Thayer (1866–1944), New York assemblyman
Wallace Thompson (1896–1952), American lawyer and legislator
Wallace "Wally" Wolf (1930–1997), American swimmer, water polo player, and Olympic champion
Wallace "Wally" Wingert (born 1961), American voice actor and former radio personality

See also
 Wallace (disambiguation)
 Wallace (surname)
 Wallis (given name)
 Wally (given name)
 Walace

English masculine given names
Masculine given names
Scottish masculine given names